In mathematics, specifically in spectral theory, an eigenvalue of a closed linear operator is called normal if the space admits a decomposition into a direct sum of a finite-dimensional generalized eigenspace and an invariant subspace where  has a bounded inverse.
The set of normal eigenvalues coincides with the discrete spectrum.

Root lineal
Let  be a Banach space. The root lineal  of a linear operator  with domain  corresponding to the eigenvalue  is defined as

 

If this set is closed (for example, when it is finite-dimensional), it is called the generalized eigenspace of  corresponding to the eigenvalue .

Definition of a normal eigenvalue
An eigenvalue  of a closed linear operator  in the Banach space  with domain  is called normal (in the original terminology,  corresponds to a normally splitting finite-dimensional root subspace), if the following two conditions are satisfied:

That is, the restriction  of  onto  is an operator with domain  and with the range  which has a bounded inverse.

Equivalent characterizations of normal eigenvalues

Let  be a closed linear densely defined operator in the Banach space . The following statements are equivalent(Theorem III.88):
  is a normal eigenvalue;

If  is a normal eigenvalue, then the root lineal  coincides with the range of the Riesz projector, .

Relation to the discrete spectrum

The above equivalence shows that the set of normal eigenvalues coincides with the discrete spectrum, defined as the set of isolated points of the spectrum with finite rank of the corresponding Riesz projector.

Decomposition of the spectrum of nonselfadjoint operators
The spectrum of a closed operator  in the Banach space  can be decomposed into the union of two disjoint sets, the set of normal eigenvalues and the fifth type of the essential spectrum:

See also
 Decomposition of spectrum (functional analysis)
 Discrete spectrum (mathematics)
 Essential spectrum
 Fredholm operator
 Operator theory
 Resolvent formalism
 Riesz projector
 Spectrum (functional analysis)
 Spectrum of an operator

References 

Spectral theory